Greena Park (born January 8, 1985) is a South Korean actress. Park debuted in the film The Ghost (2004). She has played a variety of characters and roles, including the cafe waitress Hee-young in BABO (2008), the tom·boy Soon-nam in Once Upon a Time in Seoul (2008), and the female cop Lee Min-jae in the television series The Devil (2007).

Filmography

Television series

References

External links 
  Greena Park at J's Entertainment Korea 
 
 
 

1985 births
Living people
South Korean television actresses
South Korean film actresses
Dongduk Women's University alumni
Actresses from Seoul
South Korean female martial artists